Donald Baird Marron Jr. is an American economist, professor and policy advisor and director of the nonpartisan Urban-Brookings Tax Policy Center in Washington, D.C.  He is the son of the economist and financier Donald B. Marron Sr.

Career
Marron was a member of the President's Council of Economic Advisers in 2008 and 2009. Earlier, he was the deputy director (2005–2007) and acting director (2006) of the nonpartisan Congressional Budget Office.

Marron's White House experience includes stints as a senior economic adviser and consultant to the Council of Economic Advisers (2007–08) and as its chief economist (2004–05). He was with Congress's Joint Economic Committee from 2002 to 2004, first as the Senate minority's principal economist and later as the committee’s executive director and chief economist.

Before his government service, Marron was chief financial officer of a medical software start-up in Austin, Texas and a principal with the Washington, D.C., office of Charles River Associates, where he provided business consulting and litigation support to companies in a variety of industries.

He is also President of Marron Economics, LLC, through which he does consulting and public speaking.

Marron served as a member of the Debt Reduction Task Force at the Bipartisan Policy Center.

Currently, Marron is a visiting professor at the Georgetown Public Policy Institute in Washington DC
He also served as an assistant professor of economics at the University of Chicago’s Graduate School of Business from 1994 to 1998.

Marron is currently director of the Urban Institute-Brookings Institution Tax Policy Center.

Marron has written on a broad range of topics, including tax policy, intellectual property, and energy and environmental policy.

Education
Marron graduated from Harvard College, summa cum laude in Mathematics, in 1987. He then attended the Massachusetts Institute of Technology, receiving a Ph.D. in Economics, 1994.

References

 Bush picks Marron for Council of Economic Advisers Reuters, June 28, 2007
 Georgetown University staff listing
 Articles by Donald Marron (Seeking Alpha)

External links
 Donald Marron (blog)
 Donald Marron (Linked In)
 

American economists
Businesspeople from New York City
Directors of the Congressional Budget Office
Harvard College alumni
MIT School of Humanities, Arts, and Social Sciences alumni
Living people
United States Council of Economic Advisers
Year of birth missing (living people)
Pomona College trustees
Brookings Institution people